Whippy or Whippey may refer to:

People

Surnames
 David Whippey, American sailor
 Josh Whippy, Fijian rugby player
 Marques Whippy, Fijian basketball player
 Mikaelar Whippy, Fijian basketball player
 Nicole Whippy, New Zealand actress

Stage names
 Whippy (Mia Löfgren), former vocalist of Rednex
 Whippy (Brendon Dangar), anchor of radio show Chrissie & Jane

Literature 
 Mrs. Whippy, a novella by Cecelia Ahern
 Mr. Whippy, character in A Boy Called Dad

Ice cream 

Mr. Whippy (United Kingdom), a popular brand of soft-serve ice cream mix in the United Kingdom
Mr. Whippy Australia, the former franchise of the United Kingdom company in Australia, now independent
Mr. Whippy New Zealand, the former franchise of the United Kingdom company in New Zealand, now independent

Other uses 
 Whippy, a freshwater cryptid said to dwell in Lake Massawippi
 Mr. Whippy, track on Herculean (song) by The Good, the Bad & the Queen